Charity Eke, popularly known as Chacha Eke Faani, is a Nigerian actress from Ebonyi State. Her rise to fame came when she starred in the 2012 drama film, The End is Near.

Early life, education and career
She had her basic education at ESUT Nursery & Primary School in Ebonyi State, and completed her secondary school education at Our Lord Shepherd International School in Enugu. She graduated from Ebonyi State University with a B.Sc degree in accountancy.

Selected filmography

The End is Near
Commander in Chief
Clap of Thunder
Two Hearts
Beach 24
Gift of Pain
A Cry for Justice
Jewels of the Sun
Bloody Carnival
Cleopatra
Dance For The Prince
Mirror of Life
Innocent Pain
Bridge of Contract
Palace of Sorrow
Secret Assassins
Royal Assassins
The Promise
Valley of Tears
Village Love
Weeping Angel
Rosa my Village Love
My Rising Sun
My Sweet Love
Secret Palace Mission
Stubborn Beans
Bitter Heart
Shame to Bad People
Beauty of the gods
Pure Heart
Rope of Blood
Hand of Destiny
Lucy
Sound of Ikoro
Omalicha
Bread of Sorrow
Basket of Sorrow
Festival of Sorrow
Kamsi the Freedom Fighter
Pot of Riches
Girls at War
Crossing the Battle Line
Money Works With Blood
Happy Never After
Who Took My Husband
Roasted Alive
Song of Love
My Only Inheritance
Royal First lady
Beyond Beauty
After the Altar
Bloody Campus
Princess's Revenge
Bondage
’’My Last Blood’’

Personal life
Eke is the daughter of Ebonyi State Commissioner for Education, Professor John Eke. She married Austin Faani Ikechukwu a movie director in 2013; the couple has four children (three girls and a boy). In June 2022,she announced the end of her marriage to Austin Faani.

See also
 List of people from Ebonyi State

References

External links

Nigerian film actresses
Living people
People from Ebonyi State
1987 births
Igbo actresses
Nigerian businesspeople
Nigerian women in business